The Dr. Arturo Morales Carrión Diplomatic and Foreign Relations School is the only school of international relations in Puerto Rico. The school was created by Secretary of State of Puerto Rico, David Bernier, on November 19, 2013 in order to advance the academia of diplomacy and international relations on the island which is non-existent. The school honors the name of Arturo Morales Carrión, is ascribed to the Department of State of Puerto Rico, and does not confer any degrees as it is still in development.

References

Department of State of Puerto Rico
Schools of international relations in the United States